Peter Frank Andersen (born 26 May 1970) is a former Danish football player.

External links and references
 Danish national team profile
 Profile

1970 births
Living people
Danish men's footballers
Denmark under-21 international footballers
Danish expatriate men's footballers
Association football defenders
Kjøbenhavns Boldklub players
Boldklubben Frem players
Lyngby Boldklub players
Herfølge Boldklub players
RC Strasbourg Alsace players
Ligue 1 players
Expatriate footballers in France
Akademisk Boldklub players
Olympic footballers of Denmark
Footballers at the 1992 Summer Olympics
People from Rødovre
Sportspeople from the Capital Region of Denmark